Silvana Forcellini (born 17 February 1943) is a former Italian shot putter.

Forcellini won six national championships at individual senior level.

National records
 Shot put: 14.64 m ( Zenica, 19 July 1970) - record holder until 3 April 1971.

National titles
Italian Athletics Championships
Long put: 1967, 1968, 1968, 1970 (4)
Italian Athletics Indoor Championships
Shot put: 1970. 1971 (2)

References

External links
 Piemonte culla dell'Atletica Leggera 

1943 births
Living people
Italian female shot putters
People from Belluno
Sportspeople from the Province of Belluno
20th-century Italian women
21st-century Italian women